Sergio Holguín Fierro (born 15 April 1929, date of death unknown) was a Mexican basketball player. He competed in the men's tournament at the 1952 Summer Olympics.

References

1929 births
Year of death missing
Mexican men's basketball players
Olympic basketball players of Mexico
Basketball players at the 1952 Summer Olympics
Place of birth missing